In Greek mythology, Carme (Ancient Greek: Κάρμη Karmē) was the mother, by Zeus, of the goddess Britomartis. She was either the daughter of Euboulus, the son of the Cretan priest Carmanor, or the daughter of Cassiepia and Phoenix, the son of Agenor.

Notes

References
 Celoria, Francis, The Metamorphoses of Antoninus Liberalis: A Translation with a Commentary, Routledge 1992. .
 Cook, Arthur Bernard, Zeus: A Study in Ancient Religion, Volume II: Zeus God of the Dark Sky (Thunder and Lightning), Part I: Text and Notes, Cambridge University Press 1925. Internet Archive
 Diodorus Siculus, Library of History, Volume III: Books 4.59-8. Translated by C. H. Oldfather. Loeb Classical Library No. 340. Cambridge, Massachusetts: Harvard University Press, 1939. . Online version by Bill Thayer
 Grimal, Pierre, The Dictionary of Classical Mythology, Wiley-Blackwell, 1996. .
 Pausanias, Description of Greece with an English Translation by W.H.S. Jones, Litt.D., and H.A. Ormerod, M.A., in 4 Volumes. Cambridge, MA, Harvard University Press; London, William Heinemann Ltd. 1918. . Online version at the Perseus Digital Library
Pausanias, Graeciae Descriptio. 3 vols. Leipzig, Teubner. 1903.  Greek text available at the Perseus Digital Library.
 Tripp, Edward, Crowell's Handbook of Classical Mythology, Thomas Y. Crowell Co; First edition (June 1970). .
 Smith, William; Dictionary of Greek and Roman Biography and Mythology, London (1873). Online version at the Perseus Digital Library

External links 
 CARME from the Theoi Project

Women in Greek mythology
Cretan characters in Greek mythology
Mortal women of Zeus